Mooncrest Records is a British record label that was formed in 1973 as a subsidiary of Charisma Records.

They issued albums by Shirley Collins (No Roses) (1971), Iain Matthews (Journeys from Gospel Oak) (1972), Nazareth (1973–75), Shakin' Stevens (Jungle Rock) (1976) and Alan Hull (Back to Basics) (1994). More recently they have handled Fairport Convention and Michael Chapman. The albums use the word "Crest" and the singles use the word "Moon" in their number. One single they issued was by Blessings in Disguise (Noddy Holder and Dave Hill from Slade), with their cover of "Crying in the Rain", in 1989. (It was a minor hit in the UK.) They tended to specialise in UK folk-rock and singer-songwriters.

External links
discogs.com/label: Mooncrest

1973 establishments in the United Kingdom
Record labels established in 1973
British record labels
Rock record labels
Pop record labels
Charisma Records